KAMP-LP (92.9 FM) was a high school radio station licensed to serve St. Michael, Alaska. The station was owned by Anthony A. Andrews School. It aired a high school radio format.

The station was assigned the KAMP-LP call letters by the Federal Communications Commission on October 4, 2001. The license was cancelled by the FCC on April 20, 2009.

The "other" KAMP-LP
In 2005, after Hurricane Katrina, the FCC granted a temporary license to a group in Houston, Texas, for a low-power station to broadcast relief information for evacuees inside the Astrodome and the nearby Reliant Center. The station, dubbed KAMP ("Dome City Radio"), was shut down by the Federal Emergency Management Agency (FEMA) over technical and security concerns. The KAMP callsign was unofficial, an acronym for Katrina Aftermath Media Project, as the official KAMP-LP callsign belongs to the Alaska LPFM. This was one of 20 temporary licenses for low-power emergency relief stations issued by the FCC in the wake of Hurricane Katrina.

References

External links
 

 KAMP-LP service area per the FCC database

2001 establishments in Alaska
2009 disestablishments in Alaska
Defunct radio stations in the United States
High school radio stations in the United States
AMP-LP
Nome Census Area, Alaska
Radio stations established in 2001
Radio stations disestablished in 2009
AMP-LP
AMP-LP